Lingulella is a genus of phosphatic-shelled brachiopod. It is known from the Middle Cambrian Burgess Shale (Canada) to the Upper Ordovician Bromide Formation (United States) in North America. 
346 specimens of Lingulella are known from the Greater Phyllopod bed, where they comprise 0.66% of the community.

Some specimens of the brachiopod preserve the pedicle intact, which was long and thin. The brachiopod is thought to have been a generalist, as it appears consistently throughout the strata of the Greater Phyllopod bed.

Species 
The following species have been identified:

L. agaue Mergl & Kordule, 2008
L. alabamensis
L. alata Holmer, 1989
L. alia
L. allani Walcott, 1912
L. amabilis Reed, 1917
L. angustata
L. angustior Reed, 1917
L. antiquissima Jeremejew, 1856
L. arachne Barrande, 1879
L. arctica Walcott, 1924
L. arguta
L. augusta
L. afga
L. bella
L. bellisculpta Clark, 1935
L. bohemica Koliha, 1921
L. borealis
L. brainerdi
L. brevis Portlock, 1843
L. bridgei
L. bukovensis Koliha, 1924
L. burnetensis
L. buttsi
L. bynguanoensis Roberts in Roberts & Jell, 1990
L. caelata
L. carrickensis Reed, 1917
L. chapa
L. chengjiangensis Jin, Hou & Wang, 1993
L. chinchiaensis Kobayashi, 1933
L. chinensis
L. chuarensis
L. circa Xu & Liu, 1984
L. clarkei
L. clivosa Pelman, 1983
L. clochensis?
L. columba
L. concinna
L. corralensis Rusconi, 1950?
L. damesi
L. davisii (McCoy, 1851)
L. decorticata
L. delgadoi
L. derwentii Postlethwaite, 1897
L. desiderata
L. dimorpha
L. displosa Williams 1974
L. dotensis Kobayashi, 1934
L. dusaaulti Patte, 1929
L. dzhavodiensis Sobolev, 1975
L. elata Pelman, 1986
L. ellsi
L. endopunctata
L. eucharis Resser, 1939
L. euglypha
L. exilis
L. exortiva
L. expulsa Barrande, 1879
L. fenxiangensis Wang, 1978
L. ferox
L. ferruginea Salter in Salter & Hicks, 1867
L. fostermontensis
L. franklinensis
L. galba
L. genei
L. glypta
L. grandis
L. granvillensis
L. haimantensis
L. halei
L. hatai
L. havliceki Mergl & Slehoferova, 1990
L. hayaeri
L. hayesi
L. hesperia Williams & Curry, 1985
L. hilli
L. hinganensis Su, 1980
L. hitka
L. howardi Postlethwaite, 1897
L. hsiensis
L. humaensis Su, 1980
L. huronensis
L. ibicus
L. idahoensis Resser, 1938
L. iddingsi
L. ino
L. insons Barr.
L. intermedia Liu, Zhu & Xue, 1985
L. irene
L. iris
L. jakutensis
L. jerseyensis
L. kalpinensis Zhang, 1981
L. kanabensis Resser, 1945
L. kanlingensis Zhang, 1981
L. kayseri Sun, 1923
L. kiddoi
L. kingstonensis
L. kitatiensis Aksarina, 1978
L. lasherensis Rusconi, 1951
L. lata Koliha, 1924
L. lepis Salter, 1866
L. libecovensis Koliha, 1918
L. lineolata
L. linguata Pelman, 1977
L. lirata
L. lithuanica Korkutis, 1971
L. liui
L. lochmanae
L. longa
L. longula
L. major Teixeira, Ribeiro & Silva, 1964
L. manchuriensis
L. mania
L. manticula
L. marcia Walcott, 1911
L. martillensis Rusconi, 1952
L. matthewi Koliha, 1921
L. mcconnelli Walcott, 1889
L. mechos/nechos
L. mehaeigueni Legrand, 1974
L. miltoni
L. minus
L. minuscula Sobolev, 1975
L. modesta Lochman, 1940
L. montana Fenton & Fenton, 1936
L. monticola
L. moosensis<
L. morsei
L. mosia
L. murcia var. templetonensis Chapman, 1929
L. narrawayi
L. nepos
L. nerva
L. nicholsoni Callaway, 1877
L. nina
L. nicholsoni Callaway, 1877
L. paliformis
L. parvula
L. pela densis Rusconi, 1951
L. pennsylvanica
L. perattenuata
L. petalon Davidson, 1868
L. pingchouensis
L. pingchouensis
L. proveedorensis Cooper, 1952/1954
L. putilla
L. quadrilateralis
L. quaestor Reed, 1917
L. raymondi Clark, 1924
L. remius/remus
L. reticulata
L. rideauensis
L. rotunda Pelman, 1977
L. rugosilinea
L. sanfangensis
L. sculptilis
L. sequens
L. shansiensis
L. siliqua
L. silurica Yadrenkina, 1986
L. solitariensis Rusconi, 1950
L. spicata
L. spitiensis
L. stonei
L. ubdivisa Rusconi, 1950
L. subfusula Su, 1980
L. subparallela
L. sufi Mergl & Slehoferova, 1990
L. sulcata Barrande, 1879
L. taijiangensis Huang, Wang, Zhao & Dai, 1994
L. takayamai
L. tangshihensias
L. tarpa
L. tenuitesta
L. terranovica Howell, 1943
L. texana
L. texana
L. thems mckeei Resser, 1945
L. tomkolensis Kobayashi, 1934
L. tsuchidai
L. turneri
L. variabilis Pelman, 1977
L. variolata
L. vermontensis
L. virginiensis
L. viridis Cobbold, 1921
L. wanniecki
L. waptaensis
L. welleri
L. wirthi
L. wongi
L. yabei
L. yingtzuensie Kobayashi, 1931
L. yongchengensis Zeng, 1977
L. yuechiensis Xu, 1978
L. zejszneri Bednarczyk, 1960
L. zetus
L. zeus
L. zulupeana Rusconi, 1954

Reclassified species 
L. acuminata Walcott, 1908 (current name Lingulepis acuminata Conrad)
L. acuta Pelman, 1977
L. acutangula (current name Lingulepis acutangulus Roemer, 1849)
L. africana Legrand, 1974

Distribution 
Fossils of Lingulella have been found in:
Cambrian
Australia, Canada (British Columbia, New Brunswick), China, the Czech Republic, Denmark, Greenland, India, Italy, Kazakhstan, Mexico, New Zealand, Norway, Pakistan, Poland, the Russian Federation, Sweden, the United Kingdom, and the United States (Arizona, California, Idaho, Montana, New York, Pennsylvania, South Dakota, Utah, Wisconsin, Wyoming).

Ordovician
Argentina, Australia, Canada (Newfoundland and Labrador, Quebec), China, Colombia (Serranía de la Macarena, Meta), the Czech Republic, France, Ireland, Mexico, Peru, Poland, the Russian Federation, Spain, Sweden, the United Kingdom, and the United States (Alabama, Kentucky, Montana, Nevada, New York, North Dakota, Oklahoma, Tennessee, Utah, Vermont, Virginia).

Devonian
Vietnam.

References

External links 
 

Burgess Shale fossils
Prehistoric brachiopod genera
Paleozoic brachiopods of North America
Cambrian brachiopods of North America
Ordovician animals of North America
Cambrian British Columbia
Cambrian United States
Ordovician British Columbia
Ordovician Mexico
Ordovician United States
Brachiopods of North America
Ordovician animals of Europe
Ordovician animals of South America
Ordovician Argentina
Ordovician Colombia
Ordovician Peru
Cambrian first appearances
Early Devonian genus extinctions
Fossil taxa described in 1886
Bromide Formation
Paleontology in North Dakota
Paleozoic life of New Brunswick
Paleozoic life of Newfoundland and Labrador
Paleozoic life of Quebec

Cambrian genus extinctions